Jeremiah Crowley may refer to:
 Jeremiah Crowley (politician) (1832–1901), in Massachusetts
 Jeremiah J. Crowley (1861–1927), American religious leader & writer
 Jeremiah D. Crowley, American socialist activist from New York